Madhuca neriifolia is a species of plant in the family Sapotaceae. It is native to Sri Lanka and India's Western Ghats.

References

neriifolia
Flora of India (region)
Flora of Sri Lanka
Taxonomy articles created by Polbot